Deka or DEKA may refer to:
 deka-, a variant spelling of deca-, a metric prefix
 Deka, Pomeranian Voivodeship, village in northern Poland
 DEKA (New Zealand), a defunct discount store chain, formerly in New Zealand
 DEKA (company), located in Manchester, New Hampshire in the United States
 Jadab Chandra Deka, Indian politician
 Ramesh C. Deka, specialist and the Director of All India Institute of Medical Sciences

See also 
 Deca (disambiguation)